The 2006–07 season was Beşiktaş' 49th season in the top-flight of the Turkish football league and their 104th year in existence. They finished 2nd place in the Turkish Super League behind Fenerbahçe, earning a berth in the 2007-08 UEFA Champions League. They won their 7th Turkish Cup by defeating Kayseri Erciyesspor 1–0 in extra time. They also defeated Galatasaray 1–0 to win the Turkish Super Cup. They were eliminated in the group stage in the 2006–07 UEFA Cup by finishing 4th.

Players

First-team squad
Squad at end of season

Left club during season

Results

Turkish Super Cup

Süper Lig

First Half

Second half

Standings

Turkish Cup

After finishing in the top four of the previous season's Süper Lig, Beşiktaş qualified for the group stages. Beşiktaş was placed in Group D, along with MKE Ankaragücü, Bucaspor, Çaykur Rizespor and Gençlerbirliği. Beşiktaş finished second.

Group stage

Quarter-finals

Beşiktaş won 4-2 on aggregate

Semi-finals

Beşiktaş won 2-1 on aggregate

Final

UEFA Cup

First round 

Beşiktaş won 4-2 on aggregate

Group stage

Notes

External links
Tff site

Beşiktaş J.K. seasons
Besiktas